Compton—Stanstead is a federal electoral district in Quebec, Canada, that has been represented in the House of Commons of Canada since 1997.

It was created in 1996 from Mégantic—Compton—Stanstead and Richmond—Wolfe ridings.

Geography

The southern Quebec riding on the US border southeast of Sherbrooke is located in the Quebec region of Estrie. It consists of the RCMs of Coaticook and Le Haut-Saint-François, the eastern half of Memphrémagog, and parts of Le Val-Saint-François and the city of Sherbrooke.

Main towns include Coaticook, Lennoxville (now part of Sherbrooke), North Hatley, Stanstead, and Ayer's Cliff.

Neighbouring ridings are Brome—Missisquoi, Richmond—Arthabaska, Sherbrooke, and Mégantic—L'Érable.

The 2012 electoral redistribution saw this riding lose and gain territories with Sherbrooke.

Members of Parliament

This riding has elected the following Members of Parliament:

Election results

 	

	

	
Note: Conservative vote is compared to the total of the Canadian Alliance vote and Progressive Conservative vote in the 2000 election.

See also
 List of Canadian federal electoral districts
 Past Canadian electoral districts

References

2011 Results from Elections Canada
Riding history from the Library of Parliament
Campaign expense data from Elections Canada

Notes

Quebec federal electoral districts
Politics of Sherbrooke